Gongxi is a rural town in Xinhuang Dong Autonomous County, Hunan, China. It is surrounded by Fuluo Town on the north, Pingdi Town on the west, Zhuxi Township on the east, and Tianzhu County on the south.

History
After the establishment of the Communist State in 1956, Gongxi Township was set up. In 1961 it was renamed "Gongxi People's Commune". It restored the original name in 1984. In 2015 it was upgraded to a town.

Geography

The Fuluo River winds through the town.

Transportation
The Provincial Highway S232 passes across the town north to south.

References

Xinhuang